The University of Kelaniya(abbreviated UoK) is a state university in Sri Lanka. Just outside the municipal limits of Colombo, in the city of Kelaniya, the university has two major institutions and seven faculties.

History

The University of Kelaniya has its origin in the historic Vidyalankara Pirivena, founded in 1875 by Ratmalane Sri Dharmaloka Thera as a centre of learning for Buddhist monks.

With the establishment of modern universities in Sri Lanka in the 1940s and 1950s, the Vidyalankara Pirivena became the Vidyalankara University in 1959, later the Vidyalankara Campus of the University of Ceylon in 1972, and, ultimately, the University of Kelaniya in 1978.

The University of Kelaniya has pioneered a number of new developments in higher education. It was one of the first universities to begin teaching science in Sinhala and the first to restructure the traditional Arts Faculty into three faculties: Humanities, Social Sciences, and Commerce and Management.

It has several departments not generally found in the Sri Lankan University system and some Kelaniya innovations have been adopted subsequently by other universities. These include the Departments of Industrial Management and Microbiology in the Faculty of Science; Departments of Linguistics, Fine Arts, Modern Languages and Hindi in the Faculty of Humanities; and Mass Communication and Library and Information Sciences in the Faculty of Social Sciences.

Symbols

Coat of arms
The coat of arms of the University of Kelaniya is circular and consists of three concentric bands, the outermost of which contains the name of the university in Sinhala and English. The motto of the institution, "Pannaya Parisujjhati" ("Self-purification is by insight"), is a quotation from the Alavaka-sutta of the Samyutta Nikaya, given in Sinhala characters in the same band. The middle band containing a creeper design encloses the innermost, which shows a full-blown lotus, signifying purity. These two designs are reminiscent of those occurring in the well-known moonstones at Anuradhapura.

Faculties

Faculty of Science 
The Faculty of Science started functioning in October 1967 with Prof. Charles Dahanayake as the Dean of Science. The intake of the first batch of students was 57. Formal approval for the faculty was given by the Minister of Education in 1968.

The science faculty was housed in the main building known as the "Science Block". Due to the continued increase in the student intake from year to year, a new lecture theatre complex and an auditorium were constructed in 1992, which enabled the intake of students to be increased to 450 in 2003. A new laboratory complex for the Chemistry Department and three buildings for the Departments for Industrial Management, Microbiology and Zoology have now been completed.

The science faculty was the first among the Sri Lankan universities to initiate the changeover from the traditional three subject (General) degree with end of year examinations to a more flexible course unit system, i.e., a modularized credit-based system in a two-semester academic year with the end of semester examinations. It offers a variety of course pathways designed to provide flexibility in the choice of subjects. Under this system students have the option of reading for a traditional three subject degree or for a degree consisting of two principal subjects and a selection of course units drawn from other subject areas. The BSc (Special) degree courses, begun in 1974, adopted the course unit system in 1986.

Currently, Prof. Sudath Kalingamudali is the dean of the faculty of Science.

The faculty consists of eight departments.
 Department of Botany
 Department of Chemistry
 Department of Industrial Management
 Department of Mathematics
 Department of Microbiology
 Department of Physics and Electronics
 Department of Statistics & Computer Science
 Department of Zoology & Environmental Management

Faculty of Medicine 
The Faculty of Medicine of the University of Kelaniya is on a  campus at Ragama. It is one of eight medical schools in Sri Lanka. The faculty began classes with the admission of 120 students in September 1991 after the government, in 1989, nationalised the North Colombo Medical College (NCMC), the first privately funded medical school in Sri Lanka established in 1980. The first batch of students, of the Faculty of Medicine, University of Kelaniya completed their five-year course and graduated MBBS in September 1996. Prof. Carlo Fonseka was the first dean of the faculty. Subsequent deans were Prof. Janaka de Silva, Prof. Rajitha Wickremasinghe, Prof. Nilanthi de Silva and Prof. Prasantha S. Wijesinghe. The current dean is Prof. Janaki de S. Hewavisenthi.

The faculty now has over 1,000 medical students. This number includes international students, mainly from other South Asian countries, who have been admitted on a fee-levying basis. The faculty also welcomes students for elective appointments. Students from medical schools in Europe, USA and Australia have spent their elective periods with the university. In addition to the MBBS course, it conducts a BSc programme in speech and hearing sciences.

There is a permanent academic staff of over 120 and in addition 40 temporary academic staff and over 60 visiting staff that includes consultants who are based in the affiliated teaching hospitals.

Faculty of Social Science
The Faculty of Social Sciences, in student population, is the largest faculty in the University of Kelaniya.

Department of Library and Information Science

Faculty of Humanities 
The faculty includes disciplines associated with Buddhist and Asian cultures, such as Pali and Buddhist Studies, Sinhala, Tamil, Sanskrit, Hindi, Japanese and Chinese, while teaching courses in modern European languages such as English, French, German and Russian.

Faculty of Commerce and Management 
The faculty consists of four departments:
 Department of Commerce
 Department of Accountancy
 Department of Marketing Management
 Department of Human Resource Management
 Department of Finance
The Department of Commerce was the first to be established and contribute graduates to the industry. BCOM degree is unique to the Department of Commerce. Department provides special degree in Financial Management(BCOM (special) Degree in Financial management), Business technology(BCOM (special) Degree in Business Technology), Entrepreneurship(BCOM (special) Degree in Entrepreneurship) and Commerce(BCOM (special) Degree in Commerce).

Faculty of Computing and Technology 
The University of Kelaniya established its 7th Faculty - the Faculty of Computing and Technology (FCT) on 30 December 2015 and the Faculty commenced its operations on 18 January 2016.

The Faculty will offer Postgraduate Programmes in the areas of Computer Science, Software Engineering, Information Technology and Engineering Technology. The Master of Information Technology in Education programme is currently being developed for the Ministry of Education to train ICT teachers in the national education system.

The faculty will conduct research in diverse fields of significant impact. The research enterprise at the Faculty of Computing and Technology will expand from fundamental Computer Science research to the development of new technologies with applications to the industry and society as a whole. The Faculty is planning to propose the following Research and Development Centres:
Centre for Nanotechnology
Centre for eLearning
Language Engineering Research Centre
Centre for Geo-informatics
Centre for Computational Mathematics
Centre for Data Science
Centre for Cyber Security and Digital Forensics

Faculty of Graduate Studies 
Twenty-three postgraduate degree programmes and six postgraduate diploma programmes are coordinated by the Faculty of Graduates Studies.

Postgraduate diplomas

Regional Planning
 Information Technology
 Industrial and Business Management
Environmental Management
Mathematics
Human Resource Management

Postgraduate degrees
 M.A. in Sinhala
M.A. in Linguistics
M.A. in Drama and Theatre
M. S. Sc. in Mass Communication
 M. S. Sc. in Sociology
M. S. Sc. in Geography
 M. S. Sc. in Library Science
 M. S. Sc. in Economics
 M. S. Sc. in Political Science
 M. S. Sc. in History
 M. S. Sc. in Philosophy
 MSc in Applied Microbiology
 MSc in Food and Nutrition
 MSc in Aquaculture and Fisheries Management
 MSc in Biodiversity and Integrated Environmental Management
 MSc in Industrial and Environment Chemistry
 MSc in Management and Information Technology
MSc in Computer Science
Master of Commerce
Master of Business Management
Master of Philosophy
 Doctor of Philosophy
 Doctor of Medicine

Libraries and ICT services

University Library 
The University of Kelaniya Library, has a history spanning over 60 years. In parallel to Vidyalankara Pirivena became Vidyalankara University in 1959, the library was started with a collection of books belonging to Vidyalankara Pirivena. Subsequently, it was shifted to the current premises in 1977. Later, as this old building was not sufficient enough to accommodate its growing collection and student population, the newly built four-storied building was added to the library system in 2013. Presently, the library owns a collection of over 245,000 books and monographs relevant to various study programmes and research activities in the university. Furthermore, the library has subscribed to EBSCO HOST, JSTOR, Emerald, Oxford University Press, Taylor and Francis databases with access facilities for more than 20,000 academic e-journals and more than 100,000 e-books.

Professional librarians have been appointed for each faculty to fulfil the informational requirements and information literacy training needs of the users. The services provided by the Subject Liaison Librarians are :

 Reference Sources and quick reference answers
 Information Literacy Courses
 Plagiarism Checking and consultations for avoiding plagiarism
 Library Orientation/induction Programmes including library tours
 Inter Library Loan Service
 Document Delivery Service
 Writing Help Services
 Subject Guide Services
 Literature Review Services
 Remote access via VPN and Shibboleth Services
 Special Software Training for Researchers e.g. Turnitin, Urkund, LaTeX, SPSS, Grammarly, Mendeley etc.
  Citation analysis service

Information and Communication Technology Centre 
The ICT Centre provides support services in IT-related teaching, research, internet services, staff development and hardware maintenance for the entire university. It conducts a computer literacy course open to all students and advanced courses in Visual Basic, web designing and hardware technology for the students who have successfully completed the computer literacy course. On-the-job training in the IT arena is provided for the young people just out of the university who work in the ICT Centre.

The maintenance unit provides network, hardware and software support to the clients in the university, and IT for academic departments and administrative branches of the university. Video filming of special events of the university since 2005 is an additional service.

Currently, the ICT Centre hosts web and mail services for all students and staff. They have a university-wide wifi network called "Kelani-WiFi". The ICT Centre is the first institutional Sri Lankan member of Eduroam.

Historically related institutions
The Vidyodaya University was created at the same time as the Vidyalankara University. Today Vidyodaya University is known as the University of Sri Jayewardenepura.

Students Societies and Clubs
Sports Club
Gavel Club
Art Society
Inventors Club
AIESEC
Haritha Kawaya
Buddhist Students' Society
Leo club
Humane Society
CSM

Centre for Gender Studies(CGS)
Centre for Gender studies was founded by Prof. Maithree Wickremesinghe with the objective of initiating and conducting research on Gender issues and conducting educational programs on gender studies. Currently, Dr Sagarika Kannangara acts as the director of this centre.

Faculty staff

Vice chancellors 
 Thilak Rathnakara (1978–1982)
 S. L. Kekulawala
 M. P. Perera (1983–1985)
 I. Balasooriya (1985–1987)
 M. M. J. Marasinghe
 K. Dharmasena
 H. H. Costa (1994–1997)
 Senaka Bandaranaike (1997–1999)
 Thilakaratne Kapugamage (1999–2005)
 M. J. S. Wijeyaratne (2005–2008)
 Sarath Amunugama (2008–2012)
 Sunanda Madduma Bandara (2012–2017)
 Semasinghe Dissanayake (2017–2020)
 Nilanthi de Silva (2020 - To date)

Notable alumni
 Kemal Deen
 Harendra de Silva
 Carlo Fonseka
 Janaka de Silva
 Nalin de Silva
 Saman Gunatilake
 Jagdish Kashyap
 Karunasena Kodituwakku
 Sunanda Mahendra
 Kollupitiye Mahinda Sangharakkhitha Thera
 Polwatte Buddhadatta Mahanayake Thera
 Witiyala Seewalie Thera
 Jagath Weerasinghe
 Maithree Wickremesinghe
 Harischandra Wijayatunga
 Ashin Nandamalabhivamsa
 Ashin Dhammasāmi
Anura Kumara Dissanayaka
Sevvandi Jayakody

Facilities

Hostel facilities for students
Hostel facilities are provided for selected numbers of students. Hostels are located inside and outside the university premises.
Kiriwaththuduwe Sri Prangnasara Hostel for Clergy
C.W.W. Kannangara Boys' Hostel
Yakkaduwe Pannarama Boys' Hostel
Bandaranayake Girls' Hostel
Sangamitta Girls' Hostel
Viharamahadevi Girls' Hostel
Ediriweera Sarachchandra Girls' Hostel
E.W. Adikarama Girls Hostel
Gunapala Malalasekara Girls' Hostel
Hemachandra Rai Girls' Hostel
Soma Guna Mahal (External) Girls' Hostel
Bulugaha Junction (External) Girls' Hostel

See also
 List of split up universities

References

External links 
 

 
1959 establishments in Ceylon
Educational institutions established in 1959
Statutory boards of Sri Lanka
Education in Kelaniya
Universities and colleges in Western Province, Sri Lanka
Universities in Sri Lanka